Claudio Mezzadri was the defending champion, but lost in the second round this year.

Marián Vajda won the title, defeating Kent Carlsson 6–4, 6–4 in the final.

Seeds

  Kent Carlsson (final)
  Guillermo Pérez Roldán (first round)
  Jordi Arrese (quarterfinals)
  Magnus Gustafsson (first round)
  Claudio Mezzadri (second round)
  Tomáš Šmíd (first round)
  Fernando Luna (quarterfinals)
  Bruno Orešar (second round)

Draw

Finals

Top half

Bottom half

External links
 ATP main draw

Singles